Apache Helix is an open-source cluster management framework developed by the Apache Software Foundation.

History 
Helix is one of the several notable open source projects developed by LinkedIn. It is a stable cluster management framework used for the automatic management of partitioned, replicated and distributed resources hosted on a cluster of systems.

Helix is one of several notable cluster management framework originally developed by LinkedIn apart from Apache Samza, Apache Kafka and Voldemort. The origins of Helix lie in a distributed NoSQL called Espresso.

Enterprises that use Apache Helix
The following is a list of notable enterprises that have used or are using Helix:

 LinkedIn
 Yahoo
 Uber
 Instagram
 Pinterest
 Airbnb

See also

Cluster management

References

External links
Official Website

LinkedIn software
Helix
Enterprise application integration
Free software
Free software programmed in Scala
Java platform
Message-oriented middleware
Service-oriented architecture-related products
Software using the Apache license
2011 software